Mikhail Leontievich Bulatov (1760 in Ryazan – 2 May 1825 in Omsk) was a Russian military officer who fought during the Russo-Turkish War (1787–1792) and became major general in 1799 during the Napoleonic Wars and lieutenant-general in 1823.

References

Imperial Russian Army generals
Russian commanders of the Napoleonic Wars
Russian people of the Polish–Russian War of 1792
Russian people of the Kościuszko Uprising
1760 births
1825 deaths
Recipients of the Order of St. George of the Third Degree
18th-century military personnel from the Russian Empire